is a former Japanese football player.

Playing career
Koike was born in Kanagawa Prefecture on November 10, 1974. After graduating from high school, he joined the Japan Football League club Tokyo Gas (later FC Tokyo) in 1993. He played many matches as right side back from 1994. However his opportunity to play decreased behind newcomer Hiroki Shinjo in 1996. The club was promoted to the new J2 League in 1999. He was also converted to defensive midfielder and played many matches again. The club won second place in 1999 and was promoted to the J1 League in 2000. Although he played as a regular player in 2000, he could not play at all in the match behind new members Fumitake Miura and Takahiro Shimotaira in 2001. In August 2001, he moved to the J2 club Mito HollyHock and played as a regular player. In 2002, he moved to the J2 club Shonan Bellmare. However he could hardly play in any matches. In 2003, he moved to Mito HollyHock again. However he could hardly play in any matches and retired at the end of the 2003 season.

Club statistics

References

External links

jsgoal.jp

1974 births
Living people
Association football people from Kanagawa Prefecture
Japanese footballers
J1 League players
J2 League players
Japan Football League (1992–1998) players
FC Tokyo players
Mito HollyHock players
Shonan Bellmare players
Association football midfielders